Margaret Lilian Malcolm ( Graham, 17 January 1900 – 11 December 1980) was a British writer of over 100 romance novels published by Mills & Boon from 1940 to 1981.

Bibliography

 Love Without Wings 	(1940)	a.k.a. 	Surgeon's Wife
 Loving Heart	(1940)
 One Stopped at Home	(1941)
 Where Fairy Tales End	(1941)
 The Healing Touch	(1942)	a.k.a. 	Village Hospital
 Spring of Love	(1942)
 The Enchanted Years	(1943)
 Kind and Gentle is She 	(1944)	a.k.a. 	Dr. Gregory Misunderstands
 The Master of Normanhurst	(1944)
 April's Doubting Day	(1945)
 Heart's Desire 	(1945)
 The Steadfast Flame	(1945)
 A Heart to Pity	(1946)
 No Cure For Love	(1946)
 The Thorny Rose	(1946)
 Folly Hall	(1947)
 Love is a Gift	(1947)
 First in my Heart	(1948)
 Melody in Tune	(1948)
 Without Any Amazement	(1948)
 A Stranger is My Love	(1949)
 Listen To Me!	(1949)
 The Proud House	(1949)
 The Stars Still Shine	(1949)
 Can This Be Love?	(1950)
 My Tender Fury	(1950)
 That Eagle's Fate	(1951)
 The Faithful Rebel	(1951)
 The Tempered Wind	(1951)
 The Uncharted Ocean	(1951)
 Tomorrow's Flower	(1951)
 Until You Came	(1952)	a.k.a. 	Hope for the Doctor
 Darkness Surrounds Me	(1952)
 Heart in Hand	(1952)
 Beloved Tyrant 	(1953)	a.k.a. 	Dear Tyrant
 All That Is Mine	(1953)
 Cherish This Wayward Heart	(1953)
 More Than All the World	(1953)
 Precious Vagabond	(1954)
 The Man in Homespun	(1954)
 The Walled Garden	(1954)
 Sweeter than my Dreams	(1955)	a.k.a. 	A Doctor for Diana
 The Enemy in His House	(1957)	a.k.a. 	Nurse in the House
 Fortune Goes Begging	(1958)	a.k.a. 	Nurse Langridge, Heiress
 Marriage by Agreement	(1958)
 Broken Harmony	(1960)
 Jan Marlowe, Hospital Librarian	(1960)
 Meadowsweet	(1960)
 The Willing Prisoner	(1960)
 Fragrant Harvest	(1961)
 Galleon House	(1961)
 Marriage Compromise	(1961)
 Brief Summer	(1962)
 Little Savage	(1962)
 Desolate Paradise	(1963)
 Leave Me No More	(1963)
 Scatterbrains – Student Nurse	(1963)
 Send for Nurse Vincent	(1963)
 My Valiant Fledgling	(1964)
 The Poor Relation	(1964)
 All Our Tomorrows	(1965)
 Crosswinds	(1965)
 Dear Distraction	(1965)
 Doctor Sandy	(1965)
 Kit Cavendish – Private Nurse	(1965)
 The Lonely Road	(1965)
 Mistress of Greylairs	(1966)
 New Town Neighbours	(1966)
 Yours Sincerely, Caroline	(1966)
 Johnny Next Door	(1967)
 No Place Apart	(1967)
 The Joyous Invader	(1967)
 Yours for the Finding	(1967)
 The House of Yesterday	(1968)
 Star Dust	(1968/10)
 The Head of the House	(1969/03)
 So Enchanting an Enemy	(1969/06)
 The Turning Tide	(1969/11)
 Next Door to Romance	(1970/05)
 Those Endearing Young Charms	(1970/10)
 This Tangled Web	(1971/07)
 Hunter from the Hills	(1971/10)
 Not Less Than All	(1972/03)
 No More a'Roving	(1972/07)
 Sunshine on the Mountains	(1972/10)
 The House on the Cliffs	(1973/05)
 Unpredictable Tremaynes	(1973/07)
 None to Dispute	(1973/10)
 Return to Blytheburn	(1974/01)
 A Bright Particular Star	(1974/07)
 The Hearthfire Glows	(1975/11)
 Flight to Fantasy	(1976/08)
 Dangerous Haven	(1977/03)
 Hive for the Honey Bee	(1977/06)
 Each Song Twice Over	(1978/08)
 Summer's Lease	(1978/11)
 Valley of Delight	(1979/01)
 Bowman's Acre	(1980/04)
 So Deep is the Ocean	(1980/08)
 Eagles Fly Alone	(1981/01)

References

1900 births
1980 deaths
British romantic fiction writers